Joe Brown (March 20, 1909 in Philadelphia, Pennsylvania – March 14, 1985 in Philadelphia, Pennsylvania) was an American figurative sculptor, specializing in athletes. His work was part of the sculpture event in the art competition at the 1936 Summer Olympics. Later in his career, he also worked as a playground designer.

Career
The son of Russian immigrants, he grew up in South Philadelphia and graduated South Philadelphia High School in 1926. A gifted athlete, he won a 1927 football scholarship to Temple University. He left before graduation, and briefly worked as a professional boxer. He made extra money as an artists' model, and became interested in studying sculpture. 
He served a 7-year apprenticeship under University of Pennsylvania professor and sculptor R. Tait McKenzie.

Brown became the boxing coach at Princeton University in 1937, continuing until the early 1960s. He began teaching a sculpting course in 1939, became a resident artist at the university, and was made a full professor of art in 1962. In 1955, he exhibited his sculpture at Lehigh University with works by Jose deRivera and William H. "Lone Star" Dietz in an exhibition arranged by Francis Quirk. He continued teaching at Princeton until his 1977 retirement.

In 1955, he exhibited at Lehigh University with William Dietz and Jose de Rivera in an exhibition curated by Francis Quirk.

He created more than 400 works - statuettes, portrait busts, and sculptures. Examples are on many college campuses, and in the collections of the Pennsylvania Academy of the Fine Arts, the National Academy of Design, Princeton University Art Museum, Yale University Art Gallery, the John F. Kennedy Presidential Library, and the National Art Museum of Sport.

While at Princeton in 1950, he began experimenting with structures for children to engage in active, cooperative play, which was a radical shift in thinking at the time.

Brown appeared as himself on the November 5, 1962 episode of the game show To Tell the Truth. He received three of four possible votes.

Selected sculptures

Statuettes
Duke Kahanamoku (1940). Duke Kahanamoku won gold medals in swimming at the 1912 and 1920 Olympic Games.
Jack Kelly (1942). Jack Kelly won gold medals in rowing at the 1920 and 1924 Olympic Games.
Jesse Owens (1942). Jesse Owens won 4 gold medals in track & field at the 1936 Olympic Games.
Pieta (1944). An exhausted boxer cradled by the referee. Winner of National Academy of Design's Barnett Prize.
Huddie Ledbetter (Leadbelly) (1948–49), Rock and Roll Hall of Fame, Cleveland, Ohio. Huddie Ledbetter was a blues guitarist and jazz pioneer.
Bill Bradley (1965). Bill Bradley was a member of the U.S. basketball team that won the gold medal at the 1964 Olympic Games.

Portrait busts

Bust of Robert Frost (1953), Jones Library, Amherst, Massachusetts.
Bust of Louis Brandeis (1961), Harvard University Law School, Cambridge, Massachusetts.
Bust of John Steinbeck (1964).

Larger-than-life
The Runner (1964), Johns Hopkins University, Baltimore, Maryland.
The Discus Thrower (1964), Johns Hopkins University, Baltimore, Maryland.
Gymnasts (Two Athletes) (1969), McGonigle Hall, Temple University, Philadelphia, Pennsylvania.
Benjamin Franklin - Craftsman (1981), Broad Street & John F. Kennedy Boulevard, Philadelphia, Pennsylvania.

Veterans Stadium
Four of Brown's sculptures graced Veterans Stadium from 1976 to 2003. Removed prior to the 2004 demolition, the sculptures were restored and relocated in 2005. They are now located near Citizens Bank Park, Philadelphia, Pennsylvania.
Punter (1974)
Full-Swing (The Batter) (1974)
Tackle (1974)
Play at Second Base (1974)

Gallery

References

External links
Sports Illustrated profile, November 5, 1973
New York Times obituary, March 19, 1985
Joe Brown Papers at University of Tennessee at Knoxville

1909 births
1985 deaths
Artists from Philadelphia
Sculptors from Pennsylvania
Princeton University faculty
American people of Russian descent
Temple University alumni
20th-century American sculptors
20th-century American male artists
American male sculptors
Olympic competitors in art competitions
Sports artists